is a 1993 science fiction video game for the Super Famicom. It was published by the Enix Corporation.

Gameplay 
It is a simulation role playing game.

Story
Humans have attained prosperity and high technological development. However, war broke out, and a race of automated machines called "Letum" began to destroy humanity. Magic soldiers called Junei fought them, and defeated them. Later, Vird II, King of Balmondia, releases the Letum again, and Arkfender, Lord of Algear, releases the Junei. These forces battle each other.

Release 
The game was released on August 27, 1993 for the Super Famicom and published by Enix. It was released exclusively to a Japanese audience.

Reception 
Famitsu gave it a score of 32 out of 40.

References

See also
 List of Enix games

1993 video games
Enix games
Japan-exclusive video games
Science fiction video games
Super Nintendo Entertainment System games
Super Nintendo Entertainment System-only games
Turn-based strategy video games
Video games developed in Japan